Thomas Hans Nihlén (born 1953) is a Swedish politician and former member of the Riksdag, the national legislature. A member of the Green Party, he represented Västerbotten County between October 2006 and October 2010. He was a member of the municipal council in Umeå Municipality.

References

1953 births
Living people
Members of the Riksdag 2006–2010
Members of the Riksdag from the Green Party